Yakubovich is a patronymic surname derived from the name Yakub (Russian or Belarusian: Якуб, Polish: Jakub) being a version of the name Jacob. The Polish language spelling of the same surname is Jakubowicz. The surname may refer to:
Denis Yakubovich (born 1988), Belarusian football player
Joyce Yakubowich (born 1953), Canadian sprinter
Leonid Yakubovich (born 1945), Russian television personality and actor
5994 Yakubovich, an asteroid named after Leonid
Pavel Yakubovich (born 1946), Belarusian journalist and state propagandist
Nadezhda Yakubovich (born 1954), Belarusian Soviet javelin thrower
Pyotr Yakubovich (1860–1911), Russian revolutionary poet
Vladimir Yakubovich (1926-2012), Soviet scientist
Kalman–Yakubovich–Popov lemma

Belarusian-language surnames
Surnames of Belarusian origin